Kistinka is a river in Georgia that flows in the Khevi region. It originates at the foot of the Kibishi Glacier and flows to the northwest into the river Terek near the Russian-Georgian border. The length of the river is 17 km, the basin area is 79 km².

Nomenclature 
The hydronym Kistinka derives from one of the old Ingush ethnonyms — Kisti, and is used to refer to both rivers Arm-khi (Kistetis-tskali) in the Dzheyrakhsky District and Oakhkara-khi in the Kazbegi Municipality. In 1910, Foma Gorepekin composes a short guide titled: «In the mountains of the Terek region», where he mentions being escorted along the gorge of the river Kistinka by the Buzurtanov brothers — well-known local guides and alpinists from the neighbouring Ingush village Gveleti.

The name of this river could either come from the Ingush word "okhkaro" which translates as "rich", or from the root word "kora", meaning "window" or "pass", which could refer to the path that leads to Gudauri through the pass from the Oakhkara gorge, where it passes through the gorge of the river Kora — a tributary of the Kistinka.

History 
In June 1637, F. Volkonsky and clerk A. Khvatov were sent from Moscow to Kakheti. The delegation faced difficulties due to the challenging relations between the Georgian King of Kakheti, Teimuraz I and the Duke of Aragvi, who controlled the Darial Gorge. As a result, the delegation turned to the Oakhkara gorge, where they were met by an Ingush prince named Khavsa, who escorted the delegation further to the Georgian border.

The Oakhkara gorge belonged to three Ingush families: the Yandievs, the Mamilovs, and the Aldaganovs - branches of a common ancestral family known as Chachaev. Their forefather and his relatives had resided along the entire stretch of the gorge. Due to constant conflicts with the Khevsurs, they eventually resettled to the Dzheyrakh and Kist societies. Despite this, they maintained their possession of the land and operated farms on it.

In the 1870s, Major-General Mikhail Kazbek issued an order prohibiting them the use of the land and declaring it state property.

References

Bibliography 
 
 
 
 

Rivers of Georgia (country)